The Voice of Human Justice is an English translation of Sautu'l 'Adālati'l Insaniyah (صوت العدالة الإنسانية), a book written in Arabic by George Jordac, a Christian author from Lebanon. The book is a biography of Ali ibn Abi Talib. The contents of the book were drawn from the Nahj al-Balagha of Ali.

The book depicts the personality of Ali. It also analyses the character of Ali.
According to Jordac, Nahj al-Balagha has implications relating to socio-economic justice. The first edition of the Arabic version was published in 1956. Since then, the book has been translated in various languages like English, Spanish, French, Persian and several other languages.

Author
George Jordac was a Christian author who in his own words has spent four decades researching and studying Ali. The results of his research are a few volumes of books about Ali. The Voice of Human Justice was authored by George Jordac. He began his writing career in 1950 as a journalist for the newspapers Al-Anwar, Al-Kifah Al-Arabi, Al-Qabas and several others.

The content of the book
This book is written in five volumes with the following titles:

Ali and Human Rights

This chapter includes a 256-page overview of the culture of the Hejaz, as it pertains to family life, ethics, religion, and science.

Ali and the French Revolution

Contains 256 pages in which to investigate the root causes and history of the French Revolution, and compare it with the views and principles of Imam Ali. The author argues that Imam Ali's views encompass four principles  of the French revolution.

Ali and Socrates

In this volume, the author explains views of Socrates and Ali.

Ali and his life

Contains 254 pages and contains a review and introduction of two tribes, the Umayyad and the Hashemi, and presenting events during the rule of Ali.

Ali and ethnicity Arabic

Contains 270 pages including views of Al-Maʿarri, Gibran Khalil Gibran, Mikhail Naima and some orientalists fair and equitable views about Ali. At last in the section titled "What has been said about the book" presented comments on and appreciation of the book.

References

External links
The Voice of Human Justice, 
The Voice of Human Justice source, 

1956 non-fiction books
Ali
20th-century Arabic books
Books of Islamic biography